Naaya is an open source content management system built on top of the Zope Internet and application server. It is suited for people who want to quickly start a website and reduce to a minimum the need to refer to technical system administrators for its update and maintenance. Also, it is suited for creating networks of portals due to the integrated search across multiple sites, skinnable layout and support for creating self-installable toolkits.

It is released under the Mozilla Public License (MozPL or MPL) and it is designed in a modular and extensible way. It was initially developed by the European Environment Agency and several modules were added to suit the needs of other European institutions.

Source code 
Naaya source code and relevant documentation are maintained at the Eionet Subversion repository using Trac as issue tracker for new features, bugs and enhancements.

Buildout scripts for the installation of Naaya are available on the corresponding repositories, along with some extension packages. Several custom Naaya distributions have been developed for various networks of portals with specific installation procedures, documented separately.

Developers 
Naaya was developed and it is being maintained by the European Environment Agency (EEA) through its IT consultants. The EEA also uses Naaya as the foundation for the EnviroWindows sites hosted on the EEA server as well as the Clearing House Mechanism for its Biodiversity toolkit. Although the EEA only builds the features needed for its projects, the consultants can answer questions and enhance the platform for its community of users.

Main features 

Naaya's main feature involves the capability to address cases when administration and content management operations are done by a non-technical personnel from the portal pages. The traditional CMS, which requires ZMI access to make changes, calls for technical knowledge, otherwise, it could result in errors. With Naaya, the administrator and contributors access the system using folder-level and portal-level administration pages. Content management functionalities include cut/copy/paste, delete, submit/approve/validate content, edit, translate, check-in/edit/check-out of single items. There is also a wide range of pluggable content types, starting from the standard ones till specific ones like Project, Expert, Contact. 

Naaya has powerful graphical page editor integrated, for easily creating HTML pages and this is augmented by a built-in publishing workflow that allows public submission, review, and delegation of authority. The platform is also designed to be flexible, allowing the addition of other components from the Zope open source community; the replacement of various modules to satisfy custom needs; and, the enhancement of existing components to comply with the evolving Web standards and end user demands.

References

External links
 Naaya website

Zope
Free content management systems
Python (programming language) software